In Indonesia, the Student Study Service (abbreviated as KKN) is a concept of linking academic study with the practical experience of community service. Since 1973, KKN has been integrated into the higher education curriculum for Indonesian universities, and it became one of higher education's threefold responsibilities besides teaching and conducting researches. Through the KKN program, the students are expected to share their knowledge and help local people to improve their lives and motivate them toward self-development.

For example, in Gadjah Mada University, students are assigned to go to rural areas for approximately 7 to 8 weeks and develop programs that are able to enhance the areas from three aspects: health, science and engineering, as well as humanities.

References

Development studies
Education in Indonesia